Eusthenomus is a genus of beetles in the family Cerambycidae, containing the following species:

 Eusthenomus hopei Lane, 1970
 Eusthenomus laceyi Lane, 1970
 Eusthenomus wallisi Bates, 1875

References

Anisocerini